Yasin Abdullahi Mahamoud (born 11 January 1998), known as Yasin, is a Swedish hip hop artist and gangster.

Biography
Mahamoud was born to a Somali family in Rinkeby, part of the Swedish Million Programme for affordable housing in northwest Stockholm, and grew up with his mother and five siblings. The name Yasin Byn hints at his connection to Rinkeby, which is popularly called Byn ("the village"). He started in hip hop music recording online videos with his childhood friends, including Jaffar Byn. That led to him joining the Swedish hip hop collective Byn Block Entertainment (BBE) with aspiring artists mostly from Rinkeby. BBE subsequently started collaborating with artists from the wider Järva region, forming the larger hip hop collective Ghetto Superstars. In 2016, his music was included in the Ghetto Superstars compilation album Allstars.

In 2019, he released his official debut single "DSGIS", an abbreviation of det som göms i snö (that which is hidden in snow) from a Swedish proverb. The follow-up single "XO" in collaboration with Swedish rapper Dree Low topped Sverigetopplistan, the Swedish national record chart. Yasin's album Handen under Mona Lisas kjol (Pt:1) topped the Swedish album chart. His most recent single, "Talk 2 Me", was released in December 2020 and reached the first spot on the Swedish Singles Chart.

Personal life
Mahamoud was sentenced in May 2018 to two years and three months' imprisonment for aggravated weapon-related crimes. He was released after serving two-thirds of his sentence.

On 31 December, 2020, Mahamoud was arrested and detained on the charge of kidnapping of rival rapper Einár and was sentenced to 10 months in prison by the Stockholm District Court in 2021. Haval Khalil, commonly known as simply Haval, was also sentenced to two and a half years for complicity in the kidnapping and robbery. He was later released from prison on 28 December 2021.

Discography

Studio albums

EPs

Singles

Other charted and certified songs

Notes

References

Swedish rappers
Living people
1998 births
Singers from Stockholm
Swedish people of Somali descent
21st-century Swedish criminals
Prisoners and detainees of Sweden
People convicted of kidnapping